Dota Auto Chess is a strategy video game mod for the video game Dota 2. Developed by Drodo Studio and released in January 2019, the game features elements of chess and supports up to eight players. The popularity of the mod, with its having over eight million players by May 2019, led to the creation of the auto battler genre that had a number of other games being released. Later in 2019, Drodo Studio developed a standalone version known simply as Auto Chess, while Valve, the developer of Dota 2, developed their own standalone version known as Dota Underlords.

Gameplay 
This elimination style game features elements derived from chess and Dota 2. Up to eight players are assigned to their own chessboard upon which their "home" battles are fought. Each player controls a character called a courier, which tracks the player's health, gold (also referred to as mana), and experience level. Upon the initiation of every round, an enemy team appears on the player's board (home games) and the player's team appears on an enemy's board (away games). The teams compete in an automatically generated battle over which the player has no direct control. This is why the Arcade mode of the game and its resulting offshoots are called "auto battlers". Some rounds feature players battling non-player "creeps", rather than one another. These are the first three rounds of the game and every fifth round starting at round 10. 

Gameplay proceeds over the course of multiple rounds. Each round occurs in three phases: income, preparation, and battle.  

The income rewarded at the beginning of each round is calculated based on a few different factors. On top of the base amount of gold, players receive interest based on which multiple of ten up to forty they currently have in their bank. Upon winning a battle, a player is rewarded one gold. Winning and losing streaks of five or above gift extra gold. When a player ends another player's win streak by winning their away game against said winning player, they receive extra gold. When a player is knocked out of the game, players that have contributed to their elimination receive gold and/or items.  

During the preparation phase, players select from a public pool of over fifty chess pieces based on Dota 2 characters' personas and abilities and place their pieces on the spaces within the four rows on their side of the board. Characters either have a passive or an active ability. While active abilities cost mana, the passive ones do not. Mana is gained through making attacks or when the given character is being attacked and survives. Each round that has passed gives the player gold and experience. By leveling up, the player increases the amount of units he can put on the battlefield.

Each chess piece belongs to a class and at least one particular race. These races and classes are called "synergies" and they improve the abilities of either a certain group of pieces or the entire team. Each synergy has three tiers of increasingly powerful buffs. Which tier a team is in depends on how many of each race or class they have on the board. Some synergies increase in multiples of three and others increase in multiples of two. Synergy buffs may increase the defending team's stats, decrease the opponent team's defenses, or initiate synergy specific abilities. 

Players may acquire items after killing the creeps and can give these items to their chess pieces. Each item has unique effects and some can be combined to form stronger versions. Upon a successful fight during every tenth round, the creeps drop a relic. Relics reward players with "neutral items" that manipulate the normal game rules in their favor. 

Dota Auto Chess has its own ranking system. After the end of a game, the rank of players who lose the game early will decrease, and the rank of players who lose late and the victor will increase. There are six ranks in the game, including Queen, King, Rook, Bishop, Knight and Pawn, while Queen is the highest rank and Pawn is the basic rank. There are one to nine steps in Pawn, Knight, Bishop and Rook ranks. Once players reach the highest step, their rank will increase. The King rank only has one step. When players reach the Queen rank, the global digital a number ranking is available for the top ten thousand. At the end of April 2019, the developer added a season system. After the end of a season, higher rank players achieve better rewards and the rank will reset.

All players have a basic courier at the beginning. After each game, players in the top rank are awarded "candies". Each player can achieve no more than ten candies per day. Players with Custom Pass can achieve five more candies per day. Players can spend 40 candies to roll a new courier or spend hundreds of candies to add a cosmetic effect on their couriers. Couriers have different rarities. The rare couriers are usually bigger and more appealing than normal ones. Some couriers can combine to form new couriers that cannot be bought directly. Beside earning candies in game, players can pay for candies. In January 2019, players could scan QR codes in the game to pay for candies from a third party store. Drodo Studio later disabled candy codes, but candies are still available from some third party sellers out of the game.

Development 
When asked about the inspiration of Dota Auto Chess, shortly following the mod's release, Drodo Studio stated that they drew inspiration from the Chinese tile-based game Mahjong for reference. Generally played by four people, the objective of Mahjong is to spell out a particular combination of cards through a series of replacement and trade-off rules while preventing opponents from achieving their own combinations. The game focuses on technique, strategy and calculation, but also relies on luck. While drawing inspiration from Mahjong, Dota Auto Chess made changes to accommodate the battle-oriented gameplay.

Dota Auto Chess was released by Drodo Studio to the Steam Marketplace on January 4, 2019. Since its release, Drodo Studio has updated the game with game balance adjustments, bug fixes and new content updates. The content updates include adding and removing pieces, as well as adding new races to the game. With the viral surge of popularity of the mod, Valve, the developer of Dota 2, flew Drodo Studio to their headquarters, to discuss recruiting them for developing a standalone version of Dota Auto Chess. Valve and Drodo Studio concluded that they could not work together directly, though they agreed that would build separate standalone adaptations of the game and would support one another. On June 1, 2019, Valve updated a monthly paid 'Auto Chess Pass' in the Dota 2 store, with a share of the revenue going to Drodo Studio.

Standalone game 

A standalone Auto Chess by Drodo Studio was released on Android on April 18, 2019, on iOS on May 22, 2019, and on Windows via the Epic Games Store on July 19, 2019, and for PlayStation 4 on December 16, 2020. Drodo Studio stated that besides the development of Auto Chess, they would continue to upgrade Dota Auto Chess.

Reception 
The game had over 8.5 million subscribers by May 2019, with more than 300,000 active players daily. A tournament was held in early March 2019.

Several publications praised Dota Auto Chess for its creative gameplay rules accessibility. VPEsports noted that Dota Auto Chess feels like a very strategic game: "It's a strategy game, with a feeling of a turn-based game, it has the key ingredients of card games and it requires the player to plan ahead while being rather good with APM." Game Informer offered the praise that "It's not chess, and it's not Dota, but it's a great game to queue up and play with friends or solo." "It takes a few games to start to understand how everything works, but its got some really fun strategy hooks underneath everything." PCGamesN called Dota Auto Chess "the most successful third party Dota custom game ever". Dota Auto Chess is often compared favorably with Valve's digital collectible card game, Artifact, with a number of publications stating that despite the two titles being released in close proximity, Dota Auto Chess has proven to be the more enduring game.

Several publications pointed out there was still room for improvement of the game. VP Esports noted that some bugs in the games needed to be fixed. VentureBeat tested the Drodo Auto Chess mobile game and noted that players who hadn't played Dota Auto Chess on PC might feel confused of figuring out the information of the unit on the field by saying "Drodo's mobile Auto Chess is a significantly better way to play the original great mod if you already know and comprehend the original game, and for that, it should be a success. But it feels like a perhaps smaller-scale version of Auto Chess, one designed around the small screen both visually and as a game, might be the one to take over the world like previous mods have."

The popularity of Dota Auto Chess quickly inspired a whole host of games with the creation of the auto battler subgenre. In China, there was a reported eight companies having registered the "Auto Chess" trademark in January 2019. After failing to reach an agreement with Valve, Drodo Studio partnered with Chinese production company Imba TV and Long Mobile to develop a standalone mobile version of the game called Auto Chess. Announced on March 15, 2019, Auto Chess removed Dota elements from the property and features its own separate setting. With Valve's direct technical support, Dota Auto Chess players are capable of migrating accounts to the mobile version to receive rewards. In June 2019, game developer Riot Games announced that League of Legends would feature an auto battler of their own, known as Teamfight Tactics. That same month, Valve's standalone version of the game, Dota Underlords, was released in early access for PC and mobile platforms. A version based on Hearthstone by Blizzard Entertainment, titled Hearthstone Battlegrounds, was also developed.

References

2019 video games
Auto battler video games
Esports games
MacOS games
PlayStation 4 games
Source (game engine) mods
Strategy video games
Video game mods
Video games developed in China
Windows games
Dota